La Rue Washington (born September 7, 1953) is a former outfielder in Major League Baseball who played for the Texas Rangers in  and . Listed at 6' 0", 170 lb., he batted and threw right-handed.

Born in Long Beach, California, Washington was selected by the Rangers in the 23rd round of the 1975 MLB Draft out of California State University, Dominguez Hills.

External links
, or Retrosheet
Pura Pelota (Venezuelan Winter League)

1953 births
Living people
African-American baseball players
American expatriate baseball players in Mexico
Asheville Tourists players
Baseball players from Long Beach, California
Cal State Dominguez Hills Toros baseball players
Denver Bears players
Gulf Coast Rangers players
Major League Baseball center fielders
Navegantes del Magallanes players
American expatriate baseball players in Venezuela
Petroleros de Poza Rica players
Rochester Red Wings players
Texas Rangers players
Tucson Toros players
21st-century African-American people
20th-century African-American sportspeople